Polyrhaphis gracilis is a species of beetle in the family Cerambycidae. It was described by Henry Walter Bates in 1862. It is known from Brazil, Ecuador, and Bolivia.

References

Polyrhaphidini
Beetles described in 1862